Filippa Eriksdotter Fleming (died 1578) was a Finnish noble and landowner.

She was born to Erik Fleming and Hebbla Siggesdotter, the sister of Joakim Fleming and Klas Fleming, and niece of Valborg Fleming. She was the heir of a large number of estates in both Sweden proper as well as Swedish Finland, among them Yläne manor in Pöytis in Finland, which were her prime residence. She is known for her will, in which she bequeathed Yläne manor to John III of Sweden, her estates in Sweden proper to her niece Anna Fleming, and her remaining estates to her betrothed, Knut Jönsson Kurck.

Both the fact that she issued a will and that it was accepted was exceptional: being an unmarried female rather than a widow, she had no formal right to make a will at all, and additionally, it was in any case breaking the law by excluding her brother from his inheritance.

References
 Suomen kansallisbiografia (National Biography of Finland)
 Frälsesläkter i Finland intill stora ofreden / 
 Frälsesläkter i Finland intill stora ofreden
 Anu Lahtinen: Arkea ja juhlaa Flemingien mailla
 Conciliatory, negotiating, insubordinate women. Female agency in the Fleming family, 1470–1620

Further reading 
 

1578 deaths
16th-century Finnish nobility
Swedish landowners
Finnish landowners
Year of birth missing
16th-century Finnish women
16th-century women landowners
16th-century landowners